Walter Alejandro Busse (born 3 March 1987) is an Argentine football midfielder who plays for Gimnasia y Tiro.

Career
Busse began his playing career in 2004 with Gimnasia y Esgrima de Jujuy in the Argentine 2nd division. He played in the Primera División between 2005 and 2009. During this time he had short loan stints with Juventud Antoniana of the regionalised 3rd division and with Atlético Minero of Peru.

After the relegation of Gimnasia, Busse joined Club Atlético Independiente where he soon established himself as a regular member of the first team squad.

Honours
Independiente
Copa Sudamericana (1): 2010

References
 Sarmiento inició la pretemporada y firmaron contrato Walter Busse y Guillermo Cosaro‚ diariodemocracia.com, 6 January 2016

External links
 
 
 BDFA profile 
 Argentine Primera statistics at Futbol XXI 

1987 births
Living people
Sportspeople from Salta Province
Argentine footballers
Argentine expatriate footballers
Association football midfielders
Gimnasia y Esgrima de Jujuy footballers
Club Atlético Independiente footballers
Club Atlético Huracán footballers
Juventud Antoniana footballers
Defensa y Justicia footballers
Manta F.C. footballers
Club Atlético Sarmiento footballers
San Martín de Tucumán footballers
Ferro Carril Oeste footballers
Gimnasia y Tiro footballers
Argentine Primera División players
Ecuadorian Serie A players
Primera Nacional players
Peruvian Primera División players
Argentine expatriate sportspeople in Peru
Argentine expatriate sportspeople in Ecuador
Expatriate footballers in Peru
Expatriate footballers in Ecuador